Forsyth Street runs from Houston Street south to Henry Street in the New York City borough of Manhattan. The street was named in 1817 for Lt. Colonel Benjamin Forsyth.

Forsyth Street's southernmost portion, south of Canal Street, runs parallel to the Manhattan Bridge in Chinatown. On the east side of the block from East Broadway to Canal Street, a number of so-called “Chinatown buses” (operated by different companies) start their routes to cities across the East Coast of the United States, including Boston, Philadelphia, and Washington, D.C. On the west side of this block, a greenmarket operates in the shadow of the bridge.

Forsyth Street is interrupted north of Canal Street for one block due to a 20th-century schoolhouse, now housing Pace University High School and I.S. 131, built on the former route.  From there it runs parallel to Chrystie Street that lies to its west, with Sara D. Roosevelt Park separating the two. Starting in October 2008, the parallel parking lane on the west side of the street lies not along the curbstone, but is separated from it by a bike lane carrying traffic north from the Manhattan Bridge.  The street traverses the Lower East Side neighborhood of Manhattan.

From south to north, Forsyth Street starts at Henry Street, intersects East Broadway, Division Street, and Canal Street, becomes a pedestrian street for one block, then continues from Hester Street, intersects Grand Street, Broome Street, Delancey Street, Rivington Street and Stanton Street, and ends at Houston Street.

References

Streets in Manhattan
Chinatown, Manhattan
Lower East Side